Elections were held in the ARMM for seats in the House of Representatives of the Philippines on May 13, 2013.

The candidate with the most votes won that district's seat for the 16th Congress of the Philippines.

Summary

Basilan
Hadji Hataman-Salliman is the incumbent.

Lanao del Sur

1st District
Incumbent Hussein Pangandaman is running as an independent.

2nd District
Pangalian Balindong is the incumbent.

Maguindanao

1st District
Bai Sandra Sema is Incumbent and she will face former Congresswoman Bai Sendig Dilangalen.

2nd District
Incumbent Simeon Datumanong is term-limited; his Lakas–CMD nominated Annie Datumanong, his daughter, as their nominee. Her primary opponent is Pandag Mayor Zajid Mangudadatu.

Sulu

1st District
Tupay Loong is Incumbent.

2nd District
Nur Ana Sahidulla is the incumbent.

Tawi Tawi
Incumbent Nur Jaafar is term limited and running for the governorship. Anuar Abubakar is his party's nominee.

 
 
 
 
 
 
 
 

2013 Philippine general election
Lower house elections in the Autonomous Region in Muslim Mindanao